Gordon Mulholland (30 April 1921, Cape Town, South Africa – 30 June 2010, East London, South Africa) was a British actor best known for his performances in the TV soap opera The Villagers and the movie Jock of the Bushveld.

Early life
He was born in Cape Town in 1921 to parents Sam Mulholland and Nell. It was not a happy upbringing, he was the only child of five to survive childhood. His mother was the main breadwinner while his father was described as crook and a drunkard. He would eventually be take into care at Nazareth House. He would attend Marist Brothers College but failed to complete matric.

Career
During World War 2, he joined army's entertainment corp and would entertain troop as a stand-up comedian in North Africa and Italy, performing with Sid James and Laurence Harvey. After the war ended he left for London and performed at variety and music halls including the Windmill Theatre. He would eventually migrate to West End theatres performing in productions such as Guys and Doll, Kiss Me Kate and Brush up your Shakespeare. He later starred in minor roles in British film productions.

He returned to South Africa in 1967, making his career in theatre and on Springbok Radio with Adrian Steed and Cyril Green. When television arrived in South Africa in 1976, he would star in The Villagers as mining boss Hilton McRae. He would perform in theatre with Rex Garner and Clive Scott and some of his major productions included Fiddler on the Roof and My Fair Lady.

Marriage
Mulholland was married twice. First to Muff Evans and his second wife was actress Diane Wilson whom he married in 1963 but divorced in 1972. He had three sons from the two marriages, Sean, Matthew and Jamie.

Death
Mulholland suffered a stroke in 2009, leaving his left side paralyzed and after spending a year in a nursing home, he brought back to East London and died at his sons home.

Selected filmography

Film
 Treasure Island (1950) - Durgin
 The Lady Craved Excitement (1950) - A Lunatic
 Cheer the Brave (1951)
 Hands of Space (1961)
 Coast of Skeletons (1965) - Mr. Spyker
 Der Rivonia-Prozess (1966) - Farmer (uncredited)
 Kruger Miljoene (1967) - Balloon observer (voice, uncredited)
 The Cape Town Affair (1967) - Warrant Officer du Plessis
 The Professor and the Beauty Queen (1967) - Joe
 Stop Exchange (1970)
 Vengeance Cops (1971) - Capt. Venter (voice, uncredited)
 Z.E.B.R.A. (1971) - Charles Lester (English version) (voice, uncredited)
 One Away (1976) - Detective, 'Big man'
 Mister Deathman (1977) - Dr. Halstead
 Jock of the Bushveld (1986) - Tom Barnett
 Act of Piracy (1988) - Captain Jenkins
 Headhunter (1988) - Prof. Robert Sinclair
 Rising Storm (1989) - Whitefish Aldana
 River of Death (1989) - Fanjul
 The Evil Below (1989) - Max Cash Senior
 Accidents (1989) - Tom Black
 Act of Piracy (1990) - Loring
 Traitor's Heart (1999) - Donald Brody

Television
 The Villagers (1976-1978)
 Westgate (1981) - Warren Bartlett

External links 
 
 Obituary

References

English male film actors
South African expatriates in the United Kingdom
English male soap opera actors
1921 births
2010 deaths
Place of birth missing
British Army personnel of World War II